Tewolde GebreMariam Tesfay (Amharic: ተወልደ ገብረማርያም ተስፋይ) is an Ethiopian business executive who served as the group chief executive officer of the Ethiopian Airlines Group from 2011 to 2022. He served as  Executive Officer of Marketing & Sales to head the Marketing and Sales Operations of Ethiopian in 2004. On July 1, 2006, he was appointed as Chief Operating Officer of Ethiopian to head all the operating divisions of the airline Commercial, Flight Operations, Customer Services and Maintenance and Engineering. In addition to his duties as CEO of Ethiopian Airlines, he served as a member on the High-level Advisory Group on Sustainable Transport (HLAG-ST) with United Nations Secretary – General Ban Ki-moon. He also served as a member of the Board of Governors of the International Air Transport Association (IATA); an Executive Committee member of the African Airlines Association (AFRAA); a Board member of the Airlink Advisory Council; a member of Board of Directors of Africa Travel Association (ATA); a member of Board of Directors of Ethio-Telecom, a Board member of Ethiopian Railway Corporation; a Board Member of Commercial Bank of Ethiopia; and the Chairman of the Board of Directors of the Ethiopian Tourism Organization (ETO).

Background and education
Tewolde GebreMariam is an Ethiopian national. He holds a Bachelor of Arts degree in Economics, obtained from Addis Ababa University. His second degree was a Master of Business Administration degree, obtained from the Open University, in the United Kingdom. He has also received an honorary doctorate from Addis Ababa University in 2019. Currently he owns and operates a consultancy company TGM Advisory Services LLC and he is working as a Senior Strategic Advisor at Delta Air Lines.

Career
Tewolde joined Ethiopian Airlines in 1985 as a traffic officer based in Addis Ababa.  He rose through the ranks to become Manager Cargo Traffic Handling. He then served as Area Manager and Regional Director for India based in Bombay, Saudi Arabia based in Jeddah, and then North America based in New York City. In 2004, he was appointed to head the Sales and Marketing Department of the airline, and in 2006 as the Chief Operations Officer.

Following the retirement of Girma Wake in 2011, Tewolde was elevated to the role of Group chief executive officer and retired on 23 March 2022, citing health reasons. Under his stewardship, Ethiopian Airlines grew to become the largest airline in Africa, and a member of Star Alliance.

Tewolde was especially hailed for his leadership following the crash of Ethiopian Airlines flight 302 and during the COVID-19 pandemic. Mr. Tewolde led the Airline for over a decade with remarkable success reflected in its exceptional performance in all parameters including but not limited to exponential growth from one Billion USD annual turn-over to 4.5 Billion, from 33 airplanes to 130 airplanes and from 3 million passengers to 12 million passengers (pre-COVID). Under his leadership, the airline group has grown by four fold in all measurements building more than USD 700 million worth of vital infrastructure like Africa’s biggest hotel, Cargo terminal, MRO hangars and shops, Aviation Academy and Full Flight Simulators. He was awarded the "Ordem de Rio Branco" by the Government of Brazil in recognition of his services repatriating Brazilian nationals and transporting COVID-19 vaccines.

Tewolde retired from Ethiopian Airlines in March 2022, citing personal health reasons. He was succeeded by Mesfin Tasew Bekele.

Titles, awards and honors
Mr. Tewolde GebreMariam has been a multiple award winner for his role as CEO of Ethiopian Airlines Group from 2011 to 2022. 
 African CEO of the Year award from the African CEO Forum organized jointly by Jeune Afrique and the African Development Bank in Geneva in 2012. He was awarded for his vision and leadership; pan-African scope of the strategy employed; type of modern governance and financial transparency; and quality of social, human and environmental policy. 
 The Best African Business Leader award from the Washington D.C. based Corporate Council on Africa for his support of US-Africa trade relations.
 In July 2013, he became the first African Airline CEO to receive “The Airline Strategy Award for Regional Leadership” in the award’s 12 year history. The Award is given out annually by Airline Business Magazine, a publication of Flight Global, the world’s leading aviation media brand.
 He was awarded the Planet Africa Professional Excellence Award in 2013. Planet Africa Awards recognizes commendable individuals, businesses and organizations for their hard work and excellence in leadership demonstrated through visible difference brought in the lives of people of African heritage globally, especially the young generation. 
 He won Most Gender Focused CEO Award 2015 from the Leading Women of Africa (LWA) at the continental Championship Men award ceremony held on 3rd December 2015 at Durban-South Africa.The aim is to highlight the contribution of men who have played a significant role in unlocking the potential and the acknowledgment of women as equal partners and to honor them for their influential role in the socio-economic change in Africa through women empowerment.
 Ethiopian Airlines Board of Directors awarded GebreMariam a Gold medal for his exceptional leadership, dedication and hard work, which have enabled Ethiopian to register outstanding performance as per its fast, profitable and sustainable growth strategy Vision 2025.
 The Ethiopian Group CEO was awarded a plaque for his exceptional leadership and the successful accomplishments towards Vision 2025 from Ethiopian Airlines Basic Trade Union.
 Mr.GebreMariam received the International GrandPrix Special Award in Milan in 2015 for his achievements in developing the airline into the foremost aviation group in Africa and for spearheading the transformation of Ethiopian into becoming one of the fastest growing airlines in the world. 
 MR. GebreMariam was inducted into The African CEO's Hall Of Fame by African Leadership Magazine's Persons of the Year ceremony on February 22, 2019 in Johannesburg, South Africa. The annual African Leadership Magazine Persons of the Year Award aims at celebrating Africa’s finest business, political and diplomatic leaders who are contributing to the continent’s growth and development.
 He was among 100 most influential Africans for 2 consecutive years in 2019 and 2020. The most Influential People of African Descent (MIPAD) is a global civil society initiative in support of the United Nations's International Decade for People of African Descent, recognizing high achievers in four categories namely Politics and Governance, Business and Entrepreneurship, Media & Culture and Religious and Humanitarian.
 FlightGlobal Magazine honored Mr. GebreMariam with Air Cargo Leadership Award on the Airline Strategy Awards 2021 for the commendable air cargo leadership during the pandemic. The award is in recognition of the airlines' agile strategies during the COVID-19 crisis through the CEO’s excellence in crisis leadership. Among the key criteria for the award are business performance, network strategy, innovative thinking during the crisis. Ethiopian is among the pioneers in re configuring its passenger aircraft to enhance its cargo capacity and responding to the soaring demand for shipments when the passenger business declined. 
 Mr. Tewolde received Airline Strategy Awards, 2022 organized by FlightGlobal. GebreMariam received the prestigious Airline Business Award to recognise his achievements over an 11-year spell at the helm of Ethiopian Airlines, during which he showed skill across a range of disciplines, from crisis management through to long-term strategic planning.

See also
 Girma Wake
 Mesfin Tasew Bekele

References

External links
 Official website of Ethiopian Airlines

Living people
Ethiopian chief executives
Ethiopian businesspeople
Addis Ababa University alumni
Alumni of the Open University
Ethiopian business executives
Ethiopian Airlines
Year of birth missing (living people)